Nicholas Nixon (born October 27, 1947) is an American photographer, known for his work in portraiture and documentary photography, and for using the 8×10 inch view camera.

Biography
Nixon was born in 1947 in Detroit, Michigan.

Influenced by the photographs of Edward Weston and Walker Evans, he began working with large-format cameras. Whereas most professional photographers had abandoned these cameras in favor of shooting on 35 mm film with more portable cameras, Nixon preferred the format because it allowed prints to be made directly from the large format negatives, retaining the clarity and integrity of the image. Nixon has said "When photography went to the small camera and quick takes, it showed thinner and thinner slices of time, [unlike] early photography where time seemed non-changing. I like greater chunks, myself. Between 30 seconds and a thousand of a second the difference is very large."

His first solo exhibition was at the Museum of Modern Art curated by John Szarkowski in 1976. Nixon’s early city views taken of Boston and New York in the mid-seventies were exhibited at one of the most influential exhibitions of the decade, New Topographics: Photographs of a Man-Altered Landscape at the George Eastman House in 1975. In the late nineties, Nixon returned to this subject matter to document Boston’s changing urban landscape during the Big Dig highway development project. In 1976, 1980, and 1987, Nixon was awarded National Endowment for the Arts Photography Fellowships. In 1977 and 1986, he was awarded Guggenheim Fellowships.

Nixon's subjects include schoolchildren and schools in and around Boston, people living along the Charles River near Boston and Cambridge as well as cities in the South, his family and himself, people in nursing homes, the blind, sick and dying people, and the intimacy of couples. Nixon is also well known for his work People With AIDS, begun in 1987. Nixon recorded his subjects with meticulous detail in order to facilitate a connection between the viewer and the subject.

In 1975, Nixon began his project, The Brown Sisters consisting of a single portrait of his wife, Bebe, and her three sisters each year, consistently posed in the same left to right order. As of 2021, there are forty-seven portraits altogether. The series has been shown at the St. Louis Art Museum, Museum of Modern Art,  Harvard University's Fogg Art Museum, the Cincinnati Art Museum, the Modern Art Museum of Fort Worth the National Gallery of Art, KBr Photography Center, Fundación MAPFRE in Barcelona, and the Institute of Contemporary Art, Boston. In 2010, the Museum of Fine Arts, Boston organized the exhibition "Nicholas Nixon: Family Album" which included "The Brown Sisters" series among other portraits of his wife Bebe, himself and his children Sam and Clementine.

In 2021, The Galerie le Château d’Eau presented the first major exhibition of Nixon’s work in France, an ambitious survey accompanied by an expanded catalog.

Nixon gained a B.A. from the University of Michigan in 1969 and an M.F.A from the University of New Mexico in 1975. He worked as a part-time professor at the Massachusetts College of Art and Design from 1975 until March 2018.

Allegations of inappropriate behavior
On March 22, 2018, Nixon retired from the Massachusetts College of Art and Design in mid-semester just after an investigation into alleged inappropriate behavior was announced. The investigation focuses on whether his conduct violated Title IX rules. The Boston Globe has also been investigating the professor since the beginning of 2018 for claims of sexual harassment. The paper interviewed more than a dozen former students who claimed the photographer asked undergraduate students to pose nude for him and made vulgar remarks in a classroom setting.

On April 12, 2018, the Institute of Contemporary Art, Boston decided to close an exhibition of Nixon's photographs ten days early after the museum earlier said they would keep the exhibition on view following the report by the Boston Globe. Nixon asked the museum to cancel the exhibit immediately. In 2021, the suit was settled, resolving the formal complaints against Nixon.

Books
 Photographs From One Year (1983)
 Pictures of People (1988)
 People With AIDS (with Bebe Nixon) (1991)
 School (1998)
 The Brown Sisters (2002)
 Nicholas Nixon Photographs (2003)
 Home (2005)
 The Brown Sisters, Thirty-three Years (2007)
 Live Love Look Last (2009)
 Close Far (2013)
 Forty Portraits in Forty Years (2014)
 About Forty Years (2015)
 Closing the Distance (2021)

Exhibitions
 Nicholas Nixon: Pictures of People, San Francisco Museum of Modern Art, San Francisco, CA, 1989
 Human Experience: Photographs by Nicholas Nixon, Cincinnati Art Museum, Cincinnati, OH, 2001
 Nicholas Nixon: The Brown Sisters 1975-2008, The Alhambra, Granada, Spain, 2009
 Nicholas Nixon: Family Album, Museum of Fine Art Boston, July 28, 2010 – May 1, 2011
 Nicholas Nixon: Forty Years of The Brown Sisters, Museum of Modern Art, Nov 22, 2014 – Jan 4, 2015
 Nicholas Nixon. Fundacion Mapfre, Madrid, September 14, 2017 – January 7, 2018, traveling to C/O Berlin, Berlin, Germany and Fondation A Stichting, Brussels, Belgium
Nicholas Nixon: Persistence of Vision, Institute of Contemporary Art, Boston, 2018
Nicholas Nixon: Un Infime Distance, Galerie Le Chateau D’eau, Toulouse, France, November 3, 2021– January 16, 2022

Awards 

 1976, 1980, 1987: National Endowment for the Arts Photography Fellowship

 1977, 1986: John Simon Guggenheim Memorial Foundation Fellowship
 1982: ‘New Works’ Grant, Massachusetts Council of the Arts
 1988: Friends of Photography Peer Award
 2000: George Gund Foundation Fellowship

Collections
Museum of Modern Art, New York City
Amon Carter Museum, Fort Worth, TX
Art Institute of Chicago, Chicago, IL
Baltimore Museum of Art, Baltimore, MD
Bibliothèque nationale de France, Paris, France
Cleveland Museum of Art, Cleveland, OH
Dallas Museum of Art, Dallas, TX
Denver Art Museum, Denver, CO
Detroit Institute of Arts, Detroit, MI
Harvard Art Museums, Harvard University, Cambridge, MA
High Museum of Art, Atlanta, GA
Institute of Contemporary Art, Boston, MA
George Eastman Museum, Rochester, NY
J. Paul Getty Museum, Los Angeles, CA
Los Angeles County Museum, Los Angeles, CA
Metropolitan Museum of Art, New York, NY
Musee d’Art Moderne de Paris, Paris, France
Museum of Contemporary Photography, Chicago, IL
Museum of Fine Arts, Boston, MA
Museum of Fine Arts, Houston, TX
Museum of Modern Art, New York, NY
Museum of Photographic Arts, San Diego, CA
National Gallery of Art, Washington, DC
National Gallery of Australia, Parkes, Australia
National Gallery of Canada, Ottawa, Canada
New Mexico Museum of Art, Santa Fe, NM
Philadelphia Museum of Art, Philadelphia, PA
San Francisco Museum of Modern Art, San Francisco, Ca
Seattle Art Museum, Seattle, WA
Saint Louis Art Museum, St. Louis, MO
Smithsonian American Art Museum, Washington, DC
Sprengel Museum, Hannover, Germany
Tokyo Metropolitan Museum, Tokyo, Japan
Victoria & Albert Museum, London, England

References

External links
Interview with Nixon from 2013
Forty Portraits in Forty Years—Nicholas Nixon portrait series (The Brown Sisters) 

1947 births
Living people
University of Michigan alumni
University of New Mexico alumni
American photographers
Artists from Detroit
Massachusetts College of Art and Design faculty
New Topographics photographers